Macroglossum malitum is a moth of the  family Sphingidae. It is known from the Philippines (Palawan).

References

Macroglossum
Moths described in 2001